Blue Peter is a British children's television programme, shown live on the CBBC television channel. A significant part of British culture, it first aired in 1958 and is the longest-running children's TV show in the world. Although the show has a nautical title and theme, it is a magazine / entertainment show containing viewer and presenter challenges, as well as the arts and crafts "makes".

This is a list of Blue Peter episodes listed by year.

2005

2016
Presented by Barney Harwood, Lindsey Russell and Radzi Chinyanganya every Thursday

2017
Presented by   Lindsey Russell and Radzi Chinyanganya every Thursday

4973. 27 July 2017 Big Badge Boat Bonanza!

4974. 3 August 2017 SPORTS BADGE: Sport Badge 2017 Launch!

4975. 10 August 2017 SILVER BADGE: The Robots are Coming!

4976. 17 August 2017 GREEN BADGE: Green Badge Special!

4977. 24 August 2017 PURPLE BADGE: Purple Badge Takeover!

4978. 31 August 2017 SPORTS BADGE: Summer of Sport!

4979. 7 September 2017 World Record Special!

4980. 14 September 2017 Code Breaker and Bye Bye Barney!

 NOTE: Barney Harwood's last ever Blue Peter

4981. 21 September 2017 Awesome New Competition!

4982. 28 September 2017 The Descendants and Cressida Cowell!

4983. 5 October 2017 Ali-A Takeover

4984. 12 October 2017 Birthday Bonanza!

4985. 19 October 2017 Jaqueline Wilson Takeover

  Note: First guest editor

4986. 26 October 2017 Pumpkins and Parachutes

4987. 2 November 2017 Fan Club Takeover with Sophia Grace

4989. 9 November 2017 Iggy's Back!

4990. 16 November 2017 Children in Need Spectacular

4991. 23 November 2017 Worst Witch Competition

4992. 30 November 2017 Anne-Marie and the Christmas Card! 
 
4993. 7 December 2017 Christmas is Coming!

4994. 14 December 2017 It's Chriiiiistmaaaaas!

4995. 28 December 2017 Awesome 2017!

2018
Presented by Lindsey Russell and Radzi Chinyanganya every Thursday at 17:30. 2018 marked the shows 60th anniversary.

4996. 4 January 2018 Radzi's Free Fall!

4997. 11 January 2018 Orange Badge Special!

4998. 18 January 2018 Winners and Wipeouts!

4999. 25 January 2018 Purple Badge Takeover!

5000. 1 February 2018 5,000th Show and a Brand New Badge

 NOTE: 5,000th edition and the unveil of the Diamond badge, exclusive to 2018

5001. 8 February 2018 Superstar Pancakes!

5002. 10 February 2018 Winter Sports Special

5003. 15 February 2018 Cool as Ice!

5004. 22 May 2018 Epic Science and Chris MD

5005. 1 March 2018 Book Awards 2018!

5006. 8 March 2018 Epic Rugby and a Cheesy Bake!

5007. 15 March 2018 Get Ready for a Mega Sport Relief!

5008. 22 March 2018 Sport Relief Spectacular!
5037  16 October 2018 Blue Peter Big 60th Birthday!

2020

2021

5173. 24 June 2021 Mwaksy and  Richies Army Challenge

5174 1 July 2021 almost never takeover

5175 8 July 2021  lindsey’s ultimate challenge

5176 15 July 2021  goodbye Lindsey  after eight years Lindsey hangs up her Blue Peter badge

References

Blue Peter
Blue Peter